BTW or btw may refer to:
 BTW (company), a Chinese manufacturer
 British Traditional Wicca, a set of Wiccan traditions originating in the New Forest region
 Buckfast Tonic Wine, a fortified wine licensed from Buckfast Abbey in Devon
 The Brotherhood of Timber Workers, 1910s labor union
 Burlington Trailways, an Inter-city bus company
 "By the way", popularized in internet slang
 BTW (TV station), in Bunbury, Western Australia

Codes
btw - ISO 639-3 code for Butuanon language
BTW - IATA airport code for Batu Licin Airport, Indonesia

See also
 By the Way (disambiguation)